Reza Jabireh (born July 7, 1997) is an Iranian football forward who currently plays for Iranian club Paykan in the Persian Gulf Pro League.

References

Living people
Iranian footballers
Sanat Naft Abadan F.C. players
1997 births
People from Kohgiluyeh and Boyer-Ahmad Province
Association football forwards
Footballers at the 2018 Asian Games
Asian Games competitors for Iran